Podocarpus nubigenus (also known as P. nubigena) is a species of podocarp, endemic to the Valdivian temperate rain forests of southern Chile and adjacent southwestern Argentina. It is the southernmost podocarp in the world. It grows from 38°S to Ultima Esperanza (53°S),  in wet and swampy soils. It can settle clear grounds, with a faster growth than the other Chilean Podocarpaceae.

The bark peels off in papery flakes, with a purplish to golden brown hue. The sharp, green, needle-like leaves are stiff and leathery, 2 cm long. The cones are highly modified with two to four fused, fleshy, berry-like, juicy scales, bright red when mature, bearing one (rarely two) rounded seeds at the apex of the scales.

In a classic example species-pair of the Antarctic flora, it is very closely related to Podocarpus totara from New Zealand, to the extent that if planted together, they are very difficult to distinguish. The best distinction is the slightly brighter green tone of the leaves, compared to the more greyish-green of P. totara.

Cultivation and uses 
The wood is hard and straight grained, and very resistant to rot; it is yellow with reddish marks, semiheavy, semihard, and resistant to decay, but due to scarcity, is little used.

P. nubigenus is occasionally grown as an ornamental tree in the western British Isles and the Pacific Northwest of North America, where it receives the cool summers and high rainfall it requires for successful growth. It does not have any common English name; cloud podocarp' (a translation of the scientific name); male maniu (a literal translation from the most common name in Chile), Chilean podocarp, and Chilean totara have been suggested, but are little used. Mapuche Native American and Latin American Spanish names include and mañio macho or mañíu macho and huililahuán. In southern Chile, it is also known as mañío de hojas punzantes (which is translated as prickly-leaved maniu).

Etymology
Podocarpus is derived from Greek and means 'stalked fruit'. The name is in reference to the distinctive shape of the fruit stalks of some species.

Nubigenus means 'cloud-born' or 'cloud-formed'.

References

Further reading
Donoso, C. 2005. Árboles nativos de Chile. Guía de reconocimiento. Edición 4. Marisa Cuneo Ediciones, Valdivia, Chile. 136p.
Hechenleitner, P., M. Gardner, P. Thomas, C. Echeverría, B. Escobar, P. Brownless y C. Martínez. 2005. Plantas Amenazadas del Centro-Sur de Chile. Distribución, Conservación y Propagación. Universidad Austral de Chile y Real Jardín Botánico de Edimburgo, Valdivia. 188p.
Hoffmann, Adriana 1982. Flora silvestre de Chile, Zona Araucana. Edición 4. Fundación Claudio Gay, Santiago. 258p.
Bean. W. Trees and Shrubs Hardy in Great Britain. Vol 1 – 4 and Supplement. Murray 1981
Huxley. A. The New RHS Dictionary of Gardening. 1992. MacMillan Press 1992

External links 

nubigenus
Trees of Argentina
Trees of Chile
Trees of mild maritime climate
Trees of subpolar oceanic climate
Ornamental trees
Near threatened plants
Flora of the Valdivian temperate rainforest